Christophe Caresche (born 2 September 1960 in Arcachon) was a member of the National Assembly of France from 1997 to 2017.  He represented the Paris's 18th constituency as a member of the Socialiste, radical, citoyen et divers gauche.

References

1960 births
Living people
People from Arcachon
Politicians from Paris
Socialist Party (France) politicians
Deputies of the 11th National Assembly of the French Fifth Republic
Deputies of the 12th National Assembly of the French Fifth Republic
Deputies of the 13th National Assembly of the French Fifth Republic
Deputies of the 14th National Assembly of the French Fifth Republic